Luigi Frari (Lat. Aloysius, Croat. Lujo) (Šibenik, Dalmatia, now Croatia 1813-1898) was a medical doctor and politician who served as the Chief Municipal Physician of Šibenik, and also as the mayor and political and social activist of Šibenik, Dalmatia. His special political and social efforts were related to improving the infrastructure and modernizing the city of Šibenik, as well as speaking in favor of preservation of Roman Catholic Diocese of Šibenik in 1872. He also contributed to collecting and preserving of people's proverbs in region of Šibenik. His inaugural dissertation on rabies from 1840 represents an example of conceptions of that disease in the first half of 19th century, before Louis Pasteur's time.

Origins
Luigi Frari came from an illustrious Šibenik medical family. His grandfather Giuseppe Frari came from Treviso, Republic of Venice (now Veneto), to Šibenik, Dalmatia (now Croatia), where he became the Chief Municipal Physician and the author of a work on rabies published in 1782 in Ancona: "Riflessioni teorico-mediche sopra una grave malattia, l'istoria della quale farà vedere li sintomi che precedettero (...)" (Ancona, Presso Pietro Ferri 1783). That work is considered to be the first publication on rabies written on territory of modern Croatia. His father Sebastiano was also the Chief Municipal Physician of Šibenik. His uncle Angelo Antonio Frari was Chief Municipal Physician of Split, famous epidemiologist, historian of medicine and the protomedicus of Venice, whose son Michele Carlo Frari was an illustrious professor of obstetrics at Padua University.

Dissertation on rabies 
In 1840 in Vienna Luigi ("Aloysius") Frari published his inaugural dissertation at the Padua University about rabies “De rabie canina”. It was the second inaugural dissertation on subject of rabies that was written by an author from the territory of modern Croatia, and it contained an overall description of the disease, ways of transmission, symptoms, clinical course, and the methods of curing, nursing and preventing the transmission. The dissertation was, doubtlessly in a great deal inspired by his grandfather Giuseppe Frari's pioneer work on rabies from 1782.

Political and social work in Šibenik 
However, perhaps, more than for his medical work, Luigi Frari was famous for his political and social activity and writing. He was the mayor of Šibenik and is especially remembered for his work in improving the town’s infrastructure. 
As a mayor (“il Podestà”), Frari also fought against a possible abolition of the Diocese of Šibenik in 1872. In an article published in “La Dalmazia Cattolica,” addressed directly to the Austrian Emperor, Luigi Frari provided substantial religious and civil arguments for preserving the Roman Catholic Diocese of Šibenik. 
Luigi Frari was also the president of the Šibenik Theatre Society, which financed and built Šibenik “Mazzoleni” Theater in 1870, one of the oldest in Croatia. He was a well known member of Šibenik’s intellectual and social elite of that time, who collaborated with Niccolò Tommaseo in gathering Slavic people proverbs in the Šibenik region. Although he was a Dalmatian autonomist, the radical autonomists at that time criticized him to be “a man of mild colors”.

Post-mortem sonnet 
After his death on 19 March 1898, his unknown friend, signed as “Un amico,” published a
sonnet about him. The document, written originally in Dalmatian-Venetian (translation into English by Anton Krnić) is the property of Roksanda Smolčić from Zagreb and it was presumably also published in “Il Dalmata” in 1898:

Sacred old man, tender like seraphim
Husband, father, citizen, brother
Upon your bier* a kiss of esteem
Upon your cold coffin tears and flower

You were gentle, good, you were faithful
Like Gabriel the angel resembling
I try to soothe, in this painful
Part of earth, my cry and suffering

The tired eyes are forever closed
But your spirit noble and devout
Flied bright and pure to bosom of the Lord

And in your silent grave, in autumn and spring
Sacred old man, of hair white,
Dream in peace your dream everlasting

*bier n, "bara" in Venetian, is the old English word for a movable plane on which a coffin or a corps is placed (according
to Metcalf J, Thompson D, editors. Illustrated
Oxford English dictionary. London, Oxford: Dorling
Kindesley and Oxford University press; 1998).

Literature
*Krnić A. Giuseppe and Aloysius Frari’s Works on Rabies and History of Frari Medical Family of Šibenik, Dalmatia. Croat Med J. 2007 June; 48(3): 378–390.

References

1813 births
1898 deaths
Physicians from the Kingdom of Dalmatia
Croatian politicians
People from Šibenik